American Biotech Labs, LLC. is a privately held silver nanotechnology company based in Alpine, Utah.

The company was formed in 1998 with a mission to create documentable, stable and powerful nanosilver products. It is a three-time recipient of the Best of State award for Medical Innovation.

SilverSol 
The company utilizes SilverSol nano-catalytic technology in their products. SilverSol Technology has twenty plus safety reports and test series as well as the first ever double-blind, FDA cleared, human ingestion toxicity study done on any silver product. SilverSol silver particles are Ag404 molecules. The term "Sol" is a chemical designation of a pure mineral permanently suspended in water, where the mineral's charge is transferred to the entire body of water. The technology is also known as Silver Hydrosols.

FDA approval 
FDA Approval has been granted for ASAP Wound Dressing Gel held by its sister company, ABL Medical.

Patents 
The company has been issued following patents in relation to the nano-catalytic technology: 7,135,195, 6,743,348 and 6,214,299.
In December 2010, it was issued patent 7,850,759 for "Metal Extraction from Various Chalcogenide Minerals Through Interaction with Separate Electric Fields and Magnetic Fields Supplied by Electromagnetic Energy."
Patent 20100316685 for "Dental Uses of Silver Hydrosol" is still pending approval.

Dentistry 
SilverSol technology is used in dentistry for various purposes. In a protocol called VERASIL it is being used for new connective tissue reattachment procedure using an Erbium Laser, new restorative protocols, endodontic protocols, bone grafting protocols, dental implant as well as non-surgical periodontal protocols. It has been approved by EPA for both initial cleaning and maintenance of dental waterlines. The approved product has been found to be effective against biofilms. The CRA Foundation, a leading independent dental testing lab, chose the product as a top dental waterline product based on effectiveness-cost criteria.

Revenue and statistics 
In 2008 the company generated revenue of $6 million.
As of January 2013, the company has sold 10 million units of products based on SilverSol technology.

References 

Companies based in Utah County, Utah
Biotechnology companies of the United States
Biotechnology companies established in 1998
1998 establishments in Utah